2020 California Democratic primary may refer to:

2020 California Democratic presidential primary
2020 United States House of Representatives elections in California